Røssesund Bridge (in Norwegian Røssesundbrua or Røssesund bro) is a bridge over Røssesund between the islands of Tjøme and Brøtsø in Tjøme municipality in Vestfold og Telemark county. The bridge was completed in 1952. It was financed by toll payments from traffic over the Vrengen Bridge. The bridge is 14 meters high.

See also
List of bridges in Norway

Bridges in Vestfold og Telemark
Bridges completed in 1952